The 1986 UEFA European Under-16 Championship was the fourth edition of UEFA's European Under-16 Football Championship. Greece hosted the championship, during 1–10 May 1986. 16 teams entered the competition, and the Spain won its first title.

Qualifying

Participants

 (Hosts)

Results

First stage

Group A

Group B

Group C

Group D

Semi-finals

Third place match

Final

References
UEFA.com
RSSSF.com

 
1986
UEFA
Uefa
1986
May 1986 sports events in Europe
1986 in youth association football